The Snake Man, also known as The Snake King's Wife (Pós Kéngkâng;) is a 1970 Cambodian drama horror film based on a Cambodian myth about a snake goddess, starring the most well-known Khmer actress of the era, Dy Saveth and Chea Yuthorn, who became popular in Thailand after the film's release. The film was directed by a Chinese Cambodian director, Tea Lim Koun who experienced unprecedented success as a result of the film and is known today as one of the fathers of Khmer Cinema.

The film was an enormous commercial success in Cambodia and had been released at worldwide box offices, with also much success in neighboring Thailand, which brought back an extremely better  result of grossing revenue. The film then noticed one of the biggest box-office hits in Southeast Asia at the time, holding today as Khmer Classic films for decades.
As reported by Thailand's Krung Thep Turakij newspaper, The Snake Man is a Khmer film awarded  at the 19th Asian Movie Awards in Singapore in 1972 where it received 6 golden awards including Best Director and Best Actress.

Plot 
The film begins following the life of Neang Ni, a Cambodian woman. Ni is married to her husband Minob. Ni and Minob have a young daughter. One day, Minob leaves town for work, leaving his daughter and wife at home. He tells their daughter that he will return home soon.

Ni and her daughter are scavenging for food in their crops, when Ni breaks her shovel-head in an attempt to dig. There is a snake in the hole that her shovel had burrowed, and this snake claims that he is the Snake King. The Snake King tells Ni that he will help her family if he sleeps with her. So Ni does.

Ni has hidden the affair from her husband and her daughter. However, when Minob returns, he discovers that she is pregnant and enraged by this, he manages to discover the secret and starts a plan in order to kill the Snake King. Months later, Minob is able to chop the snake and cook the snake meat as food for Ni after the many failed attempts.  After Ni found out about the death of the Snake King, she was murdered by her cruel husband while she was bathing.  As her womb was opening, there were several little snakes being born; however, most of them were killed by Minob.  Only one of the snakes was able to survive. As a child, the only lasting snake, Veasna arrived at a hermit's cottage where the hermit turned him into a human and also named him, Veasna.

Several years later, Veasna, grew up to be a handsome man and he began to fall in love with a rich man's daughter, Soriya.  While they were in love, Soriya's stepmother who was jealous of their relationship planned an attempt to split them apart. She too was madly in love with Veasna. However, when Soriya's mother realizes that Veasna is a snake she meets an old witch who made a spell to transfer him back to a snake.  The Villagers were so afraid that they abandoned the wedding as the rich man, Soriya's father, dropped dead immediately after his step wife ran away for her life.  Despite his features, his wife still loved him, until one day, she gave birth to a female baby called Cantra. Unfortunately, she was born with tiny snakes as her hair for the old witch had put a curse on her family.  When she grew up, her father, suddenly, turned to stone and her mother became a psycho after she was kidnapped and forced to eat the blood of raw meat as food.  Cantra became an orphan and also became the servant for the ugly witch until one day, she found a plan to break the curse by midnight when the witch was seeking for food with only her head and intestine.  Cantra went to the witch's locker room and burned everything including the witch's body.  The witch arrived in time and was also burned in the fire. Finally, the curse was broken and her parents became normal human beings as Cantra's hair turned long and beautiful. The family all lived happily ever after in a big house.

Release 
Pous Keng Kang (which translates to 'The Giant Snake' in Cambodian/Khmer) was an almost immeasurable success in Cambodia, therefore resulting in its release to foreign non-affiliated countries including many Asian countries and several parts of Europe. In Thailand, the film reached double the number of hits than that of the Cambodia Box office. This was due partially to the Civil war that the kingdom of Cambodia was enduring.

Remakes and sequel 

After the return of peace in Cambodia, the first major movie made in Cambodia was The Snake King's Child, intended as a sequel of The Snake King's Wife .

References

External links 
 

1970 films
Khmer-language films
1970 horror films
Films about snakes
Natural horror films
Cambodian horror films